Karanavar or Karanavan or Karanava, parsimoniously speaking, was the title of male head in Malayalee and Kodava society.

Karnavar is also a surname for some aristocratic Nair families in and around Budhanur, Chengannur, Kerala, India, all branches of the same original family at Budhanur. One legend is that it was conferred by Marthanda Varma the King of Travancore. While consolidating his newly found Kingdom of Thiruvithamkur (Travancore), the nephew Rama Varma (later Dharma Raja) and sister of Marthanda Varma were passing through the said area under the protection of Vattaparambil Valiathan and were attacked by the people of the Ettuveetil Pillamar. Marthanda Varma's brother in law and other fighters lost their life but the sister, the Rani of Attingal, and her son escaped and ran through the fields ("Budhanoor padam")where they met an aristocratic Nair family man who was managing farming in the field. He addressed the man as "Karnavar" and asked for his help. He helped them by protecting him and informed the nearby King's ally  known as Aaruveetil Madampimar who in turn informed the Vakkavanjipuzha Madhom, the head of which, known as the Vanjipuzha Thampuran, was an ally of Marthanda Varma. Eventually Rama Varma endowed him with riches and the hereditary surname of Karnavar when he became the Maharajah.

Nair (Kerala , Surname Karnavar)

The senior most maternal uncle was the head of the matrilineal joint families, known as Tharavadu, and was called Karnavar. The authority of the Karnavar in a family is unquestionable. Even after the decline of Matrilineal system, the word is used to denote authority, and elderly person. This titile is given by the Maharaja of Travancore to an aristocratic Nair family because they have saved the Rani of Attingal.

Kodava
The founder of a Kodava Okka (clannish family) was known as "karona". During ancestral spirit worship, a Malayalee would act as a shaman and would get possessed by Karona spirit of a particular Okka.

Karanavar
The honorific plural Karanavar is used for the community point man in the Bhagavathi temples. In old days, Koil Thampuran(a Namboothiri ruler) would nominate him.

References

Kerala society
Karnataka society
Nair